Camissonia campestris (field primrose, Mojave sun cup, or Mojave suncup), is a flowering plant in the family Onagraceae, native to the Mojave Desert of the United States. It grows mostly on open, sandy flats, occurring from sea level to 2,000 m in the western and central part of the desert.

It is an annual plant growing to 5–25 cm tall (rarely to 50 cm tall). The leaves are linear, 0.5–3 cm long, with a finely serrated margin. The flowers have four petals 5–15 mm long, yellow with a red spot at the base, fading orange to reddish.

References

Jepson Flora Project: Camissonia campestris
Mojave Desert Wildflowers, Jon Mark Stewart, 1998, pg. 76

campestris
North American desert flora
Flora of California
Plants described in 1891